Ptari-tepui, also spelled Pu-tari and sometimes called Cerro Budare or Cerro del Budare, is a tepui in Bolívar state, Venezuela. Though generally flat, distinctive erosional rock formations are found on the more dissected eastern edge of the summit.

Description 
Ptari-tepui gives its name to the Ptari Massif, which also includes Carrao-tepui to the northeast and a long ridge known as Sororopán-tepui to the southeast. The massif is situated entirely within the bounds of Canaima National Park.

Ptari-tepui is a prime example of the classic tepui shape, having an almost perfectly flat-topped summit and near-vertical walls. This characteristic profile is said to recall the shape of a budare, a type of griddle used for making cassava bread, and is the source of its Pemón-derived name. For this reason it is also sometimes known as Cerro Budare or Cerro del Budare.

See also
 Gran Sabana
 Distribution of Heliamphora

References

Further reading

 Hudec, I. (1998). Anomopoda (Crustacea: Branchiopoda) from some Venezuelan tepuis. Hydrobiologia 377(1–3): 205–211. 
 Morton, C.V. (1957). Pteridophyta: Ptari-tepuí. [pp. 729–741] In: J.A. Steyermark et al. Botanical exploration in Venezuela -- 4. Fieldiana: Botany 28(4): 679–1225.
 Spangler, P.J. (1981). New and interesting water beetles from Mt. Roraima and Ptari‐tepui, Venezuela (Coleoptera: Dytiscidae and Hydrophilidae). Aquatic Insects: International Journal of Freshwater Entomology 3(1): 1–11. 

Tepuis of Venezuela
Mountains of Venezuela
Mountains of Bolívar (state)